Yuaytacondorsenja (possibly from Quechua wayta crest; wild flower; the whistling of the wind, kuntur condor, sinqa nose,) is a   mountain in the Chila mountain range in the Andes of Peru . It is located in the Arequipa Region, Castilla Province, Chachas District. Yuaytacondorsenja lies northwest of Chila and Chila Pillune. It is situated at the end of a valley named Puncuhuaico (possibly from Quechua for p'unqu pond, dam, wayq'u valley or stream). Its stream flows to Chachas Lake.

References

Mountains of Peru
Mountains of Arequipa Region